An overline, overscore, or overbar, is a typographical feature of a horizontal line drawn immediately above the text. In old mathematical notation, an overline was called a vinculum, a notation for grouping symbols which is expressed in modern notation by parentheses, though it persists for symbols under a radical sign. The original use in Ancient Greek was to indicate compositions of Greek letters as Greek numerals. In Latin, it indicates Roman numerals multiplied by a thousand and it forms medieval abbreviations (sigla). Marking one or more words with a continuous line above the characters is sometimes called overstriking, though overstriking generally refers to printing one character on top of an already-printed character.

An overline, that is, a single line above a chunk of text, should not be confused with the macron, a diacritical mark placed above (or sometimes below) individual letters. The macron is narrower than the character box.

Uses

Medicine

In most forms of Latin scribal abbreviation, an overline or macron indicates omitted letters similar to use of apostrophes in English contractions. Letters with macrons or overlines continue to be used in medical abbreviations in various European languages, particularly for prescriptions. Common examples include

Note, however, that abbreviations involving the letter h take their macron halfway up the ascending line rather than at the normal height for Unicode overlines and macrons: ħ. This is separately encoded in Unicode with the symbols using bar diacritics and appears shorter than other overlines in many fonts.

Math and science

Decimal separator

In the Middle Ages, from the original Indian decimal writing, before printing, an overline over the units digit was used to separate the integral part of a number from its fractional part, as in 995 (meaning 99.95 in decimal point format). A similar notation remains in common use as an underbar to superscript digits, especially for monetary values without a decimal separator, as in 99.

Vinculum
In mathematics, an overline can be used as a vinculum.

The vinculum can indicate a line segment:The vinculum can indicate a repeating decimal value:  When it is not possible to format the number so that the overline is over the digit(s) that repeat, one overline character is placed to the left of the digit(s) that repeat: 

Historically, the vinculum was used to group together symbols so that they could be treated as a unit. Today, parentheses are more commonly used for this purpose.

Statistics
The overline is used to indicate a sample mean:
 is the average value of 

Survival functions or complementary cumulative distribution functions are often denoted by placing an overline over the symbol for the cumulative: .

Negation
In set theory and some electrical engineering contexts, negation operators (also known as complement) can be written as an overline above the term or expression to be negated. For example:

Common set theory notation:

Electrical engineering notation:

in which the times (cross) means multiplication, the dot means logical AND, and the plus sign means logical OR.

Both illustrate De Morgan's laws and its mnemonic, "break the line, change the sign".

Negative
In common logarithms, a bar over the characteristic indicates that it is negative—whilst the mantissa remains positive. This notation avoids the need for separate tables to convert positive and negative logarithms back to their original numbers.

Complex numbers
The overline notation can indicate a complex conjugate and analogous operations.
if , then

Vector
In physics, an overline sometimes indicates a vector, although boldface and arrows are also commonly used:

Congruence classes 
This set, consisting of all the integers congruent to  modulo , is called the congruence class, residue class, or simply residue of the integer  modulo .

Topological closure

Improper rotation
In crystallography, an overline indicates an improper rotation or a negative number:
 is the Hermann–Mauguin notation for a threefold rotoinversion, used in crystallography.

Maximal conductance
In computational neuroscience, an overline is used to indicate the "maximal" conductances in Hodgkin-Huxley models. This goes back to at least the landmark paper published by Nobel prize winners Alan Lloyd Hodgkin and Andrew Fielding Huxley around 1952.

Antiparticles
Overlines are used in subatomic particle physics to denote antiparticles for some particles (with the alternate being distinguishing based on electric charge).

Engineering 
An active low signal is designated by an overline, e.g. , representing logical negation.

Morse (CW) 
Some Morse code prosigns can be expressed as two or three characters run together, and an overline is often used to signify this. The most famous is the distress signal, .

Writing
An overline-like symbol is traditionally used in Syriac text to mark abbreviations and numbers. It has dots at each end and the center. In German it is occasionally used to indicate a pair of letters which cannot both be fitted into the available space.

When Morse code is written out as text, overlines are used to distinguish prosigns and other concatenated character groups from strings of individual characters.

In Arabic writing and printing, overlines are traditionally used instead of underlines for typographic emphasis, although underlines are used more and more due to the rise of the internet.

Linguistics
X-bar theory makes use of overbar notation to indicate differing levels of syntactic structure. Due to difficulty in typesetting the overbar, the prime symbol is often used instead, as in X. Contemporary typesetting software, such as LaTeX, has made typesetting overbars considerably simpler; both prime and overbar markers are accepted usages. Some variants of X-bar notation use a double-bar (or double-prime) to represent phrasal-level units.

X-bar theory derives its name from the overbar. One of the core proposals of the theory was the creation of an intermediate syntactic node between phrasal (XP) and unit (X) levels; rather than introduce a different label, the intermediate unit was marked with a bar.

Implementations

HTML with CSS

In HTML using CSS, overline is implemented via the text-decoration property; for example, <span style="text-decoration: overline">text</span> results in: .

The text decoration property supports also other typographical features with horizontal lines: underline (a line  the text) and strikethrough (a line  the text).

Unicode

There is also . As with any combining character, it appears in the same character box as the character that logically precedes it: for example, x̅, compared to x‾. A series of overlined characters, for example 1̅2̅3̅, may result either in a broken or an unbroken line, depending on the font.

In Unicode, character   is conjoining (bridging) two characters: .

In East Asian (CJK) computing,  is available. Despite the name, Unicode maps this character to both U+203E and U+00AF.

Unicode maps the overline-like character from ISO/IEC 8859-1 and code page 850 to the  symbol mentioned above. In Microsoft Windows, U+00AF can be entered with the keystrokes  (where numbers are entered from the numeric keypad). In GTK, the symbol can be added using the keystrokes  to activate Unicode input, then type "00AF" as the code for the character. On a Mac, with the ABC Extended keyboard, use .

The Unicode character  is used to mark Syriac abbreviations and numbers. However, several computer environments do not render this line correctly or at all.

The Unicode character  is used as a length mark in Odia script.

Word processors
In Microsoft Word, overstriking of text can be accomplished with the EQ \O() field code. The field code {EQ \O(x,¯)} produces  and the field code {EQ \O(xyz,¯¯¯)} produces . (Doesn't work in Word 2010; it is necessary to insert MS Equation object).
Windows:  (once before character, one more time after character).

LibreOffice has direct support for several styles of overline in its "Format / Character / Font Effects" dialog.

TeX
In LaTeX, a text <text> can be overlined with $\overline{\mbox{<text>}}$. The inner \mbox{} is necessary to
override the math-mode (here invoked by the dollar signs) which the \overline{} demands.

See also 

 Ā
 Titlo, an overline used to indicate numerals or abbreviations in Cyrillic
 Underscore

References

Typography
Punctuation
Ancient Greek punctuation